2015 AFF Futsal Club Championship was the first edition of AFF Futsal Club Championship. The tournament was held in Bangkok, Thailand from 23 to 29 November.
The Futsal clubs from AFF member countries were invited to compete in the tournament.

Participants

Group A (Men’s) 

  Thai Port
  Felda United
  MIC
  East Coast Heat
  Sanna Khanh Hoa

Group B (Women's) 

  BG-College of Asian Scholars
  Felda United
  MIC
  Dural Warriors
  Thai Son Nam

Venue

Group stage

Group A (Men’s)

Third place match

Final

Winner

Group B (Women's)

Third place match

Final

Winner

References

External links
 AFF FUTSAL CLUB CHAMPIONSHIP 2015, aseanfootball.org

AFF Futsal Club Championship
2015 in Asian futsal
International futsal competitions hosted by Thailand
2015 in Thai football
Sport in Bangkok
November 2015 sports events in Asia